Remix Romance Vol. 1 is a remix compilation album by Sally Shapiro.  It collects previously existing and newly minted versions of tracks from Disco Romance, including those produced by Holy Fuck, Jon Brooks, Junior Boys, The Juan MacLean, Lindstrøm, Skatebård, and Tensnake.

Some tracks feature the addition of live instruments, most notably on The Cansecos' version of "Hold Me So Tight".

Track listing 
All tracks written by Johan Agebjörn except where stated.

"I'll Be By Your Side (Tensnake Remix)" — 7:37
"I Know You're My Love (The Juan MacLean Remix)" (Agebjörn/MacLean) — 8:00
"Find My Soul (Holy Fuck Remix)" — 4:22
"Anorak Christmas (Woodhands Remix)" (Roger Gunnarsson) — 5:20
"He Keeps Me Alive (Skatebård Remix)" (Gunnarsson) — 3:57
"Hold Me So Tight (The Cansecos Remix)" — 6:26
"Skating in the Moonshine (Jon Brooks Remix)" — 4:25
"Jackie Junior (Junior Boys Remix)" (Gunnarsson/Agebjörn/Didemus/Greenspan) — 5:05
"Time To Let Go (Lindstrøm Remix)" — 10:58
"Sleep in My Arms (Between Interval Remix)" (Agebjörn/Erik van den Broek) — 5:28

Personnel and Credits

Personnel
 Sally Shapiro — Vocals
 Johan Agebjörn — Original production, backing vocals
 Evelina Joëlson — Backing vocals on original versions of "Anorak Christmas", "Jackie Junior", and "Skating in the Moonshine"
 Anna Sanne Göransson — Backing vocals on original versions of "Jackie Junior" and "Skating in the Moonshine"

Credits
Compilation selection by Sally Shapiro and Johan Agebjörn.

References

External links
 Paper Bag Records recording catalogue entry

Sally Shapiro albums
2008 remix albums
Paper Bag Records remix albums